Hohenthal is a surname meaning high valley. Notable people with this surname include:

 Lennart Hohenthal, murderer of Eliel Soisalon-Soininen
 Karl Hohenthal, one of the pseudonyms of Karl May
 Peter Hohmann, Edler of Hohenthal
 Sebastian Hohenthal (born 1984), Swedish racing driver
 Weli Hohenthal (1880–1966), Finnish modern pentathlete